Orogrande is an unincorporated community in Otero County, New Mexico, United States, located at a latitude of 32.37111 and a longitude of -106.08389 in the Jarilla Mountains of the Tularosa Basin on U.S. 54 between El Paso, Texas and Alamogordo. Originally a mining town named Jarilla Junction due to its proximity to the Jarilla Mountains, established in 1905, the town was renamed Orogrande (Spanish for big gold) in 1906 and is not far from similar mining towns (now completely abandoned ghost towns) named Brice and Ohaysi. The population soared to approximately 2000 as the result of a gold rush that occurred in 1905, but quickly collapsed almost to the point of depopulation when the gold deposits proved much less abundant than expected. There are still numerous abandoned mines in the area which fall under the jurisdiction of the Bureau of Land Management.  Other land around Orogrande is part of a military reservation under the control of Fort Bliss.

The community had a population of 52 in the 2010 census. It is served by a post office and has the zip code 88342.

Demographics

Education
It is zoned to Alamogordo Public Schools. Yucca Elementary School is the zoned elementary school, and Mountain View Middle School is the zoned middle school. Alamogordo High School is the district's comprehensive high school.

On July 1, 1959 Orogrande became a part of the Alamogordo school district. At that time elementary students went to school in Orogrande while high school students attended school in Alamogordo. In July 1959 the school district closed the Orogrande school as it felt all students could come to Alamogordo and the district could save money.

References

External links
 Orogrande and the Jarilla Mountains

Unincorporated communities in Otero County, New Mexico
Unincorporated communities in New Mexico